The Pyrohoshcha Dormition of the Mother of God Church or simply Pyrohoshcha Church is an Orthodox church in Kyiv in the historical neighbourhood Podil. The original church was built in 1130s by the Mstyslav I the Great of Kyiv. It was the main church of Podil, and was a temporary cathedral of Kyiv Metropolitanate in the early 17 century. In 1613 the church was reconstructured in Renaissance style, and then in 18th-19th centuries was rebuilt in Ukrainian Baroque and Neoclassicism styles.

In 1934, the church became the cathedral of Ukrainian Autocephalous Church when its center moved from Kharkiv to Kyiv together with the capital of Ukrainian SSR. But it was in that status less than a year, being destroyed in 1935 by the Soviet administration for the reason of "reconstructing the square". Then, for some time the church was largely forgotten by the time the research on its remains began in 1976. At that time the idea of rebuilding of the church appeared, but the project was completed only in 1997, providing the restoration in the hypothetic ancient Rus style, which was made in 1997-1998. However, the historical originality of the reconstruction is still in discussion.

On the Easter 1998, the rebuilt Pyrohoshcha was consecrated as a church of the Ukrainian Orthodox Church of the Kyivan Patriarchate. On 11 November 2012 Patriarch Filaret consecrated the church religious paintings.

Churches in Kyiv
12th-century Eastern Orthodox church buildings
Churches completed in 1998
Churches of the Orthodox Church of Ukraine
Rebuilt buildings and structures in Ukraine
Church buildings with domes